Grenland Bridge (in Norwegian Grenlandsbrua) is Norway's highest cable-stayed bridge with a tower height of . The bridge, which opened in 1996, is on route E18. It crosses the Frierfjord, a fjord which separates the municipalities of Porsgrunn and Bamble in Vestfold og Telemark county. When built, it replaced Brevik Bridge (Breviksbrua) as the primary route across the fjord.

References

External links
Grenland Bridge on en.Broer.no

Bridges in Vestfold og Telemark
Buildings and structures in Porsgrunn
Cable-stayed bridges in Norway
Bridges completed in 1996
1996 establishments in Norway